Pärsti Parish was a rural municipality of Estonia, in Viljandi County.

After the municipal elections held on 20 October 2013, Pärsti Parish was merged with Paistu, Saarepeedi and Viiratsi parishes to form a new Viljandi Parish around the town of Viljandi.

On 1 January 2009, it had a population of 3,824 (as of 1 January 2009) and an area of 210.62 km2.

Settlements
Small borough
Ramsi
Villages
Alustre - Heimtali - Jämejala - Kiini - Kiisa - Kingu - Kookla - Laanekuru - Leemeti - Marna - Matapera - Mustivere - Päri - Pärsti - Pinska - Puiatu - Raudna - Rihkama - Savikoti - Sinialliku - Tohvri - Tõrreküla - Turva - Väike-Kõpu - Vanamõisa - Vardi

References

External links
 

Parsti Parish
Landforms of Viljandi County